Berliner Philharmonie
 Kölner Philharmonie
 Elbphilharmonie, Hamburg
 Jenaer Philharmonie
 Philharmonie im Gasteig, Munich
 Neue Philharmonie Frankfurt
 Philharmonie de Paris
 Philharmonie Luxembourg

See also 
 Philharmonic Hall (disambiguation)